The common pheasant (Phasianus colchicus) is a bird in the pheasant family (Phasianidae). The genus name comes from Latin phasianus, "pheasant". The species name colchicus is Latin for "of Colchis" (modern day Georgia), a country on the Black Sea where pheasants became known to Europeans. Although Phasianus was previously thought to be closely related to the genus Gallus, the genus of junglefowl and domesticated chickens, recent studies show that they are in different subfamilies, having diverged over 20 million years ago.

It is native to Asia and parts of Europe like the northern foothills of the Caucasus and the Balkans. It has been widely introduced elsewhere as a game bird. In parts of its range, namely in places where none of its relatives occur such as in Europe, where it is naturalised, it is simply known as the "pheasant". Ring-necked pheasant is both the name used for the species as a whole in North America and also the collective name for a number of subspecies and their intergrades that have white neck rings.

It is a well-known gamebird, among those of more than regional importance perhaps the most widespread and ancient one in the whole world. The common pheasant is one of the world's most hunted birds; it has been introduced for that purpose to many regions, and is also common on game farms where it is commercially bred. Ring-necked pheasants in particular are commonly bred and were introduced to many parts of the world; the game farm stock, though no distinct breeds have been developed yet, can be considered semi-domesticated. The ring-necked pheasant is the state bird of South Dakota, one of only two US state birds that is not a species native to the United States.

The green pheasant (P. versicolor) of Japan is sometimes considered a subspecies of the common pheasant. Though the species produce fertile hybrids wherever they coexist, this is simply a typical feature among fowl (Galloanseres), in which postzygotic isolating mechanisms are slight compared to most other birds. The species apparently have somewhat different ecological requirements and at least in its typical habitat, the green pheasant outcompetes the common pheasant. The introduction of the latter to Japan has therefore largely failed.

Description

There are many colour forms of the male common pheasant, ranging in colour from nearly white to almost black in some melanistic examples. These are due to captive breeding and hybridisation between subspecies and with the green pheasant, reinforced by continual releases of stock from varying sources to the wild. For example, the "ring-necked pheasants" common in Europe, North America and Australia do not pertain to any specific taxon, they rather represent a stereotyped hybrid swarm.

The body plumage is barred bright gold or fiery copper-red and chestnut-brown plumage with iridescent sheen of green and purple; but rump uniform is sometimes blue. The wing coverage is white or cream and black-barred markings are common on the tail. The head is bottle green with a small crest and distinctive red wattle. P. c. colchicus and some other races lack a white neck ring. Behind the face are two ear-tufts, that make the pheasant more alert.

Juvenile birds have the appearance of the female with a shorter tail until young males begin to grow characteristic bright feathers on the breast, head and back at about 10 weeks after hatching.

The green pheasant (P. versicolor) is very similar, and hybridisation often makes the identity of individual birds difficult to determine. Green pheasant males on average have a shorter tail than the common pheasant and have darker plumage that is uniformly bottle-green on the breast and belly; they always lack a neck ring. Green pheasant females are darker, with many black dots on the breast and belly.

In addition, various colour mutations are commonly encountered, mainly melanistic (black) and flavistic (isabelline or fawn) specimens. The former are rather common in some areas and are named Tenebrosus pheasant (P. colchicus var. tenebrosus).

Taxonomy and systematics

This species was first scientifically described by Carl Linnaeus in his landmark 1758 10th edition of Systema Naturae under its current scientific name. The common pheasant is distinct enough from any other species known to Linnaeus for a laconic [Phasianus] rufus, capîte caeruleo – "a red pheasant with blue head" – to serve as entirely sufficient description. Moreover, the bird had been extensively discussed before Linnaeus established binomial nomenclature. His sources are the Ornithologia of Ulisse Aldrovandi, Giovanni Pietro Olina's Uccelliera, John Ray's Synopsis methodica Avium & Piscium, and A Natural History of the Birds by Eleazar Albin. Therein—essentially the bulk of the ornithology textbooks of his day—the species is simply named "the pheasant" in the books' respective languages. Whereas in other species, such as the eastern meadowlark (Sturnella magna), Linnaeus felt it warranted to cite plumage details from his sources, in the common pheasant's case he simply referred to the reason of the bird's fame: principum mensis dicatur. The type locality is given simply as "Africa, Asia".

However, the bird does not occur in Africa, except perhaps in Linnaeus's time in Mediterranean coastal areas where they might have been introduced during the Roman Empire. The type locality was later fixed to the Rioni River in western Georgia – known as Phasis to the Ancient Greeks. These birds, until the modern era, constituted the bulk of the introduced stock in parts of Europe that was not already present; the birds described by Linnaeus's sources, though typically belonging to such early introductions, would certainly have more alleles in common with the transcaucasian population than with others. The scientific name is Latin for "pheasant from Colchis", colchicus referring to the west of modern-day Georgia; the Ancient Greek term corresponding to the English "pheasant" is Phasianos ornis (Φασιανὸς ὂρνις), "bird of the river Phasis". Although Linnaeus included many Galliformes in his genus Phasianius—such as the domestic chicken and its wild ancestor the red junglefowl, nowadays Gallus gallus—today only the common and the green pheasant are placed in this genus. As the latter was not known to Linnaeus in 1758, the common pheasant is naturally the type species of Phasianus.

In the US, common pheasants are widely known as "ring-necked pheasants". More colloquial North American names include "chinks" or, in Montana, "phezzens". In China, meanwhile, the species is properly called zhi ji (雉鸡)—"pheasant-fowl"—essentially implying the same as the English name "common pheasant". Like elsewhere, P. colchicus is such a familiar bird in China that it is usually just referred to as shan ji (山雞), "mountain chicken", a Chinese term for pheasants in general.

As of 2005, it had the smallest known genome of all living amniotes, only 0.97 pg (970 million base pairs), roughly one-third of the human genome's size; however, the black-chinned hummingbird is now currently held to have the smallest.

Subspecies

There are about 30 subspecies in five to eight groups. These can be identified by the male plumage, namely presence or absence of a white neck-ring and/or a white superciliary stripe, the colour of the uppertail (rump) and wing coverts, and the colour of crown, chest, upper back, and flank feathers. As noted above, introduced populations have mixed the alleles of various races by various amounts, differing according to the original stock used for introductions and what natural selection according to climate and habitat has made of that.

An investigation into the genetic relationships of subspecies revealed that the earliest subspecies is likely to have been elegans, suggesting that the common pheasant originated from the forests of southeastern China. Initial divergence is thought to have occurred around 3.4 Mya. The lack of agreement between morphology-based subspecies delimitation and their genetic relationships is thought to be attributed to past isolation followed by more recent population mixing as the pheasant has expanded its range across the western Palaearctic.

Sometimes this species is split into the Central Asian common and the East Asian ring-necked pheasants, roughly separated by the arid and high mountainous regions of Turkestan. However, while the western and eastern populations probably were entirely separate during the Zyryanka glaciation when deserts were more extensive, this separation was not long enough for actual speciation to occur. Today, the largest variety of colour patterns is found where the western and eastern populations mix, as is to be expected. Females usually cannot be identified even to subspecies group with certainty.

Many subspecies are in danger of disappearing due to hybridisation with introduced birds. The last indigenous black-necked pheasant (P. c. colchicus) population in Europe survives in Greece in the delta of the river Nestos, where in 2012 the population was estimated 100–250 individuals.

The subspecies groups, going from west to east, and some notable subspecies are:

Within a maximum clade credibility mDNA gene tree, the most basal group is the elegans-group of the Eastern Clade, diverging from the green pheasant during the Calabrian, and diversifying in Middle Pleistocene around 0.7 million years ago, with the groups of the Western Clade splitting off from those of the Eastern Clade about 0.59 million years ago. While the subspecies of the Western Clade are well geographically separated from each other, the subspecies of the Eastern Clade often show clinal variation and large areas of intergradation. For example, clines connect pallasi-karpowi-torquatus-takatsukasae within the torquatus-group and kiangsuensis-alaschanicus-sohokhotensis-strauchi within the strauchi/vlangalii-group, with the degree of expression of white collar and superciliary stripe in both cases decreasing from north to south. The isolated form hagenbecki is very close to pallasi in phenotype, and has been traditionally treated within the torquatus-group until recently, when it was assigned in one study to the strauchi/vlangalii group. However, the origin of the corresponding feather samples as listed in GenBank is far away from the known distribution of subspecies hagenbecki, and the issue needs further clarification.

Ecology

Common pheasants are native to Asia and parts of Europe, their original range extending from the Balkans (where the last truly wild birds survive around Nestos river in Greece), the Black and Caspian Seas to Manchuria, Siberia, Korea, Mainland China, and Taiwan. The birds are found in woodland, farmland, scrub, and wetlands. In its natural habitat the common pheasant lives in grassland near water with small copses of trees. Extensively cleared farmland is marginal habitat that cannot maintain self-sustaining populations for long.

Common pheasants are gregarious birds and outside the breeding season form loose flocks. However, captive bred common pheasants can show strong sexual segregation, in space and time, with sex differences in the use of feeding stations throughout the day. Wherever they are hunted they are always timid once they associate humans with danger, and will quickly retreat for safety after hearing the arrival of hunting parties in the area.

While common pheasants are able short-distance fliers, they prefer to run. If startled however, they can suddenly burst upwards at great speed, with a distinctive "whirring" wing sound and often giving kok kok kok calls to alert conspecifics.

Nesting
Common pheasants nest solely on the ground in scrapes, lined with some grass and leaves, frequently under dense cover or a hedge.  Occasionally they will nest in a haystack, or old nest left by other bird. They roost in sheltered trees at night.  The males are polygynous as is typical for many Phasianidae, and are often accompanied by a harem of several females. Common pheasants produce a clutch of around 8–15 eggs, sometimes as many as 18, but usually 10 to 12; they are pale olive in colour, and laid over a 2–3 week period in April to June.  The incubation period is about 22–27 days.  The chicks stay near the hen for several weeks, yet leave the nest when only a few hours old.  After hatching they grow quickly, flying after 12–14 days, resembling adults by only 15 weeks of age.

They eat a wide variety of animal and vegetable type-food, like fruit, seeds, grain, mast, berries and leaves as well as a wide range of invertebrates, such as leatherjackets, ant eggs, wireworms, caterpillars, grasshoppers and other insects; with small vertebrates like lizards, field voles, small mammals and small birds occasionally taken.

European native
Southern Caucasian pheasants (P. c. colchicus) were common in Greece during the classical period and it is a widespread myth that the Greeks took pheasants to the Balkans when they colonised Colchis in the Caucasus. This colonization happened during the 6th century BC, but pheasant archaeological remains in the Balkans are much older dating to 6th millennium BC. This fact indicates that probably pheasants reached the area naturally. Additionally it seems that they had a continuous range in Turkey from the Sea of Marmara on the edge of the Balkans, across the northern shore of the country till Caucasus. The last remnants of the Balkan population survive in the Kotza-Orman riparian forest of Nestos, in Greece with an estimated population of 100–200 adult birds. In Bulgaria they were lost in the 1970s because they hybridised with introduced eastern subspecies.

Besides the Balkans the species lives in Europe in the area north of Caucasus where the local subspecies P.c.septentrionalis survives pure around the lower reaches of the Samur River. Reintroduction efforts in the rest of the north Caucasian range may include hybrid birds.

As an introduced species

Common pheasants can now be found across the globe due to their readiness to breed in captivity and the fact they can naturalise in many climates, but were known to be introduced in Europe, North America, Japan and New Zealand.  Pheasants were hunted in their natural range by Stone Age humans just like the grouse, partridges, junglefowls and perhaps peafowls that inhabited Europe at that time.  At least since the Roman Empire, the bird was extensively introduced in many places and has become a naturalized member at least of the European fauna.  Introductions in the Southern Hemisphere have mostly failed, except where local Galliformes or their ecological equivalents are rare or absent.

The bird was naturalized in Great Britain around AD 1059, but may have been introduced by the Romano-British centuries earlier. It was the Caucasian subspecies mistakenly known as the 'Old English pheasant' rather than the Chinese ring-necked pheasants (torquatus) that were introduced to Britain. But it became extirpated from most of the isles in the early 17th century. There were further re-introductions of the 'white neck-ringed' variety in the 18th century. It was rediscovered as a game bird in the 1830s after being ignored for many years in an amalgam of forms. Since then it has been reared extensively by gamekeepers and was shot in season from 1 October to 31 January. Pheasants are well adapted to the British climate and breed naturally in the wild without human supervision in copses, heaths and commons.

By 1950 pheasants bred throughout the British Isles, although they were scarce in Ireland. Because around 30,000,000 pheasants are released each year on shooting estates, mainly in the Midlands and South of England, it is widespread in distribution, although most released birds survive less than a year in the wild.  The Bohemian was most likely seen in North Norfolk.  The Game & Wildlife Conservation Trust is researching the breeding success of reared pheasants and trying to find ways to improve this breeding success to reduce the demand to release as many reared pheasants and increase the wild population.  As the original Caucasian stock all but disappeared during the Early Modern era, most 'dark-winged ringless' birds in the UK are actually descended from 'Chinese ring-necked' and 'green pheasant' hybrids, which were commonly used for rewilding.

North America
Common pheasants were introduced in North America in 1773, and have become well established throughout much of the Rocky Mountain states (Colorado, Idaho, Montana, Wyoming, etc.), the Midwest, the Plains states, as well as Canada and Mexico. It is now most common on the Great Plains. Common pheasants have also been introduced to much of northwest Europe, the Hawaiian Islands, Chile, Uruguay, Peru, Argentina, Brazil, South Africa, New Zealand, and Australia including the island state of Tasmania and small offshore islands such as Rottnest Island off Western Australia.

Most common pheasants bagged in the United States are wild-born feral pheasants. In some states captive-reared and released birds make up much of the population.

Pheasant hunting is very popular in much of the US, especially in the Great Plains states, where a mix of farmland and native grasslands provides ideal habitat. South Dakota alone has an annual harvest of over 1 million birds a year by over 200,000 hunters.

Negative impacts on other birds 
There are a number of negative effects of common pheasants on other game birds, including: nest parasitism, disease, aggression, and competition for resources.  Nest parasitism, or brood parasitism, is common in pheasants because of their propensity to nest near other birds and the fact that nesting requirements are similar to those of other prairie birds and waterfowl that inhabit the same areas.  This phenomenon has been observed in grey partridges; prairie chickens; several types of duck, rail, grouse, turkeys, and others.  Effects of nest parasitism may include abandonment of nests with a high proportion of foreign eggs, lower hatching rates, and lower numbers of eggs laid by the host species. Pheasant eggs also have a shorter incubation time than many of their nestmates, which may result in the individual watching over the nest to abandon her own eggs after the pheasants hatch, thinking that the remaining eggs are not viable.  Pheasants raised in other species' nests often imprint on their caretaker, which may result in them adopting atypical behaviour for their species. This is sometimes the cause of hybridisation of species as pheasants adopt the mating behaviour of their nest's host species.

Pheasants often compete with other native birds for resources. Studies have shown that they can lead to decreased populations of bobwhites and partridges due to habitat and food competition. Insects are a valuable food source for both pheasants and partridges and competition may lead to decreased populations of partridges. Pheasants may also introduce disease, such as blackhead, to native populations. While pheasants tolerate the infection well, other birds such as ruffed grouse, chukar, and grey partridge are highly susceptible. Pheasants also have a tendency to harass or kill other birds. One study noted that in pheasant vs. prairie chicken interactions, the pheasants were victorious 78% of the time.

Management strategies 
A variety of management strategies have been suggested for areas that are home to species that are particularly threatened by pheasants, such as the prairie chickens and gray partridge. These strategies include mowing grass to decrease the nesting cover preferred by pheasants, decreasing pheasant roosting habitat, shooting pheasants in organized hunts, trapping and removing them from areas where there are high concentrations of birds of threatened species, and others.

Population change 
While pheasant populations are not in any danger, they have been decreasing in the United States over the last 30 years, largely in agricultural areas. This is likely due to changes in farming practices, application of pesticides, habitat fragmentation, and increased predation due to changes in crops grown.  Many crops beneficial for pheasants (such as barley) are not being farmed as much in favor of using the land for more lucrative crops, such as nut trees.  Many of these new crops are detrimental to pheasant survival. Pheasants prefer to nest in areas of significant herbaceous cover, such as perennial grasses, so many agricultural areas are not conducive to nesting anymore. Pheasant hens also experience higher levels of predation in areas without patches of grassland.

In the United Kingdom, about 50 million pheasants reared in captivity are now released each summer, a number which has significantly increased since the 1980s.  Most of these birds are shot during the open season (1 October to 1 February), and few survive for a year.  The result is a wildly fluctuating population, from 50 million in July to less than 5 million in June.

As gamebirds

Common pheasants are bred to be hunted and are shot in great numbers in Europe, especially the UK, where they are shot on the traditional formal "driven shoot" principles, whereby paying guns have birds driven over them by beaters, and on smaller "rough shoots". The open season in the UK is 1 October – 1 February, under the Game Act 1831. Generally they are shot by hunters employing gun dogs to help find, flush and retrieve shot birds. Retrievers, spaniels and pointing breeds are used to hunt pheasants.

The doggerel "Up gets a guinea, bang goes a penny-halfpenny, and down comes a half a crown" reflects the expensive sport of 19th century driven shoots in Britain, when pheasants were often shot for sport, rather than as food. It was a popular royal pastime in Britain to shoot common pheasants. King George V shot over 1,000 pheasants out of a total bag of 3,937 over a six-day period in December 1913 during a competition with a friend; however, he did not do enough to beat him.

Common pheasants are traditionally a target of small game poachers in the UK but, due to the low value of pheasants in the modern day, some have resorted to stealing chicks or poults from pens. The Roald Dahl novel Danny the Champion of the World dealt with a poacher (and his son) who lived in the United Kingdom and illegally hunted common pheasants.

Pheasant farming is a common practice and is sometimes done intensively. Birds are supplied both to hunting preserves/estates and restaurants, with smaller numbers being available for home cooks.

The carcasses were often hung for a time to improve the meat by slight decomposition, as with most other game. Modern cookery generally uses moist roasting and farm-raised female birds. In the UK and US, game was making somewhat of a comeback in popular cooking and more pheasants than ever were being sold in supermarkets there in 2011. A major reason for this is consumer attitude shift from consumption of red meat to white meat.

See also
Hunting and shooting in the United Kingdom

References

Bibliography

External links

 Ring-necked Pheasant - Phasianus colchicus - USGS Patuxent Bird Identification InfoCenter
 Ring-necked Pheasant Species Account – Cornell Lab of Ornithology
 Ring-necked Pheasant at enature.com
 Royal Society for the Protection of Birds (RSPB) pheasant page
 
 
 

common pheasant
Poultry
Birds of Asia
common pheasant
Symbols of South Dakota
Taxa named by Carl Linnaeus
Extant Pleistocene first appearances